A list of films produced in Italy in 1925 (see 1925 in film):

See also
List of Italian films of 1924
List of Italian films of 1926

External links
 Italian films of 1925 at the Internet Movie Database

Italian
1925
Films